S. Ravi Mariya (born August 4, 1979) is an Indian film director and actor who works primarily in Tamil cinema. He appears in villain and supporting roles.

Career
Ravi Mariya's directorial debut was meant to be Nee Naan Kaadhal starring Prashanth for Super Good Films, but the project was later stalled.

Filmography

All films are in Tamil, unless otherwise noted.

As actor

As director

As dialogue writer

References

External links
 
 

Living people
1972 births
Tamil film directors
21st-century Indian film directors
Male actors from Tamil Nadu
Male actors in Tamil cinema
People from Virudhunagar district
21st-century Indian male actors
Male actors in Malayalam cinema
Indian male film actors
Male actors in Telugu cinema
Film directors from Tamil Nadu
Tamil screenwriters
Screenwriters from Tamil Nadu